During the Pliocene epoch (5.3 Ma to 2.6 Ma), the Earth's climate became cooler and drier, as well as more seasonal, marking a transition between the relatively warm Miocene to the cooler Pleistocene. 

However, the global average temperature in the mid-Pliocene (3.3 Ma–3 Ma) was 2–3°C higher than today, global sea level 25 meters higher, and the northern hemisphere ice sheet was ephemeral before the onset of extensive glaciation over Greenland that occurred in the late Pliocene around 3 Ma.
The formation of an Arctic ice cap is signaled by an abrupt shift in oxygen isotope ratios and ice-rafted cobbles in the North Atlantic and North Pacific ocean beds. Mid-latitude glaciation was probably underway before the end of the epoch. The global cooling that occurred during the Pliocene may have spurred on the disappearance of forests and the spread of grasslands and savannas.

During the Pliocene the earth climate system response shifted from a period of high frequency-low amplitude oscillation dominated by the 41,000-year period of Earth's obliquity to one of low-frequency, high-amplitude oscillation dominated by the 100,000-year period of the orbital eccentricity characteristic of the Pleistocene glacial-interglacial cycles.

The equatorial Pacific Ocean sea surface temperature gradient was considerably lower than it is today. Mean sea surface temperatures in the east were substantially warmer than today but similar in the west. This condition has been described as a permanent El Niño state, or “El Padre.” Several mechanisms have been proposed for this pattern, including increased tropical cyclone activity.

Setting
During the late Pliocene and early Pleistocene Series of the Cenozoic Era, 3.6 to 2.2 Ma (million years ago), the Arctic was much warmer than it is at the present day (with summer temperatures from 3.6-3.4 Ma some 8°C warmer than today). That is a key finding of research into a lake-sediment core obtained in Eastern Siberia, which is of exceptional importance because it has provided the longest continuous late Cenozoic land-based sedimentary record thus far.

Central Asia became more seasonal during the Pliocene, with colder, drier winters and wetter summers, which contributed to an increase in the abundance of  plants across the region. In the Loess Plateau, δ13C values of occluded organic matter increased by 2.5% while those of pedogenic carbonate increased by 5% over the course of the Late Miocene and Pliocene, indicating increased aridification. Further aridification of Central Asia was caused by the development of Northern Hemisphere glaciation during the Late Pliocene.

In the south-central Andes, an arid period occurred from 6.1 to 5.2 Ma, with another occurring from 3.6 to 3.3 Ma. These arid periods are coincident with global cold periods, during which the position of the Southern Hemisphere westerlies shifted northward and disrupted the South American Low Level Jet, which brings moisture to southeastern South America.

In northwestern Africa, tropical forests extended up to Cape Blanc during the Zanclean until around 3.5 Ma. During the Piacenzian, from about 3.5 to 2.6 Ma, the region was forested at irregular intervals and contained a significant Saharan palaeoriver until 3.35 Ma, when trade winds began to dominate over fluvial transport of pollen. Around 3.26 Ma, a strong aridification event that was followed by a return to more humid conditions, which was itself followed by another aridification around 2.7 Ma. From 2.6 to 2.4 Ma, vegetation zones began repeatedly shifting latitudinally in response to glacial-interglacial cycles.

The climate of eastern Africa was very similar to what it is today. Unexpectedly, the expansion of grasslands in eastern Africa during this epoch appears to have been decoupled from aridification and not caused by it, as evidenced by their asynchrony.

Southwestern Australia hosted heathlands, shrublands, and woodlands with a greater species diversity compared to today during the Middle and Late Pliocene. Three different aridification events occurred around 2.90, 2.59, and 2.56 Ma, and may have been linked to the onset of continental glaciation in the Arctic, suggesting that vegetation changes in Australia during the Pliocene behaved similarly to during the Late Pleistocene and were likely characterised by comparable cycles of aridity and humidity.

Onset of glaciation

Greenland ice sheet

Several mechanisms have been proposed to explain global cooling after 3 Ma and the onset of extensive northern hemisphere glaciation.

Panama seaway closure

The closure of the Panama seaway (13 Ma–2.5 Ma) increased the salinity contrast between Pacific and Atlantic Ocean and the northward oceanic heat transport. Warmer water increased snowfall and possibly Greenland ice sheet volume. However, model simulations suggest reduced ice volume due to increased ablation at the edge of the ice sheet under warmer conditions.

Collapse of permanent El Niño

A permanent El Niño state existed in the early-mid-Pliocene. Warmer temperature in the eastern equatorial Pacific caused an increased water vapor greenhouse effect and reduced the area covered by highly reflective stratus clouds, thus decreasing the albedo of the planet. Propagation of the El Niño effect through planetary waves may have warmed the polar region and delayed the onset of glaciation in the northern hemisphere. Therefore, the appearance of cold surface water in the east equatorial Pacific around 3 million years ago may have contributed to global cooling and modified the global climate’s response to Milankovitch cycles.

Uplift of the Rocky Mountains and Greenland’s west coast

Uplift of the Rocky Mountains and Greenland’s west coast may have cooled the climate due to jet stream deflection and increased snowfall due to higher surface elevation.

Carbon dioxide
Carbon dioxide concentration during the mid-Pliocene has been estimated at around 400 ppmv from 13C/12C ratio in organic marine matter. and stomatal density of fossilized leaves, Decreasing carbon dioxide levels during the late Pliocene may have contributed substantially to global cooling and the onset of northern hemisphere glaciation.

West Antarctic ice sheet 

The extent of the West Antarctic Ice Sheet oscillated at the 40 kyr period of Earth's obliquity. Ice sheet collapse occurred when the global average temperature was 3°C warmer than today and carbon dioxide concentration was at 400 ppmv. This resulted in open waters in the Ross Sea. Global sea-level fluctuation associated with ice-sheet collapse was probably up to 7 meters for the west Antarctic and 3 meters for the east Antarctic.

Model simulations are consistent with reconstructed ice-sheet oscillations and suggest a progression from a smaller to a larger west Antarctic ice sheet in the last 5 million years. Intervals of ice sheet collapse were much more common in the early-mid Pliocene (5 Ma – 3 Ma), after three-million-year intervals with modern or glacial ice volume became longer and collapse occurs only at times when warmer global temperature coincide with strong austral summer insolation anomalies.

Mid-Pliocene and future climate 

The mid-Pliocene warm period, also known as the mid-Piacenzian Warm Period (mPWP), is considered a potential analogue of future climate. The intensity of the sunlight reaching the earth, the global geography, and carbon dioxide concentrations were similar to present. Furthermore, many mid-Pliocene species are extant, helping calibrate paleotemperature proxies. Model simulations of mid-Pliocene climate produce warmer conditions at middle and high latitudes, as much as 10–20 °C warmer than today above 70°N. They also indicate little temperature variation in the tropics. Model-based biomes are generally consistent with Pliocene palaeobotanical data indicating a northward shift of the tundra and taiga and an expansion of savanna and warm-temperate forest in Africa and Australia.

See also 

 Pliocene
 El Niño
Five Million Years of Climate Change

References 

Pliocene
History of climate variability and change